The NWA Southern Tag Team Championship (Mid-Atlantic version) was the Mid-Atlantic territory version of the NWA Southern Tag Team Championship and was defended between 1953 until 1968 when it became the NWA Atlantic Coast Tag Team Championship. It is one of the earliest titles to be defended in the Carolinas, most often in Lenoir, Greensboro and Charlotte, North Carolina.

Title history

References

National Wrestling Alliance championships
Tag team wrestling championships
Regional professional wrestling championships